Fairfax District may refer to:
Fairfax District, Los Angeles, California
Fairfax District (Kansas City, Kansas)